Attaloss is an American rock band from Los Angeles, California, United States, currently signed to Rock Ridge Music.

The band released their self-titled album on April 10, 2012, and first week sales have pushed the release onto four Billboard charts.  The album, which was released by Rock Ridge Music/Warner Music Group/ADA, hit #1 on Billboard Alternative New Artists, #5 on Billboard Heatseekers, #25 on Billboard Hard Rock Albums, and #42 on Billboard Indie chart.  The album also cracked the Billboard Top 200 sales chart.

Discography

Studio albums

References

Rock music groups from California
Musical groups from Los Angeles
Musical groups established in 2010
Rock Ridge Music artists
2010 establishments in California